The coronation of the Nepalese monarch was a rājyābhiṣeka, a Hindu religious ceremony in which the King of Nepal was crowned. The last coronation was held on 4 June 2001 for King Gyanendra. The Kingdom of Nepal was the last Hindu monarchy in the world at the time of its dissolution in 2008.

Preparations
The coronation would happen on a date selected by court astrologers for its auspiciousness. On the chosen day, the new King would have eight different types of clay ceremoniously applied to parts of his body. He would then bathe in holy water before being sprinkled with a mixture of butter, milk, curd and honey by a representative of the four traditional varnas of the Hindu society – a brahmin, a kshatriya, a vaishya and a shudra.

Crowning ceremony
Only after these had been done was the King allowed to be crowned. At the most auspicious moment, selected by the astrologers, the King would be crowned by the royal priest with the Crown of Nepal, a large jewel-encrusted crown.

After the ceremony
The King's subjects, family and courtiers would salute him and there would be a parade. The King, royal family and other guests and courtiers would ride through the streets of the capital Kathmandu on elephants.

Gallery

See also
Rājyābhiṣeka
Coronation of the Thai monarch

References

Nepal
Nepalese monarchy
Ceremonies in Nepal